St Joseph's College is a co-educational private school for day and boarding pupils between the ages of 2 and 19 in Ipswich, Suffolk, England. With usually 550-600 pupils on the roll, the College is located in South West Ipswich, surrounded by a 60-acre campus, which includes administrative offices in the Georgian Birkfield House, a nursery and Prep School, the College Chapel, and teaching and sports facilities. Also in the grounds are the College's two boarding houses, Goldrood and The Mews.

History
St Joseph's College was established in 1937 by the De La Salle Brothers, a Catholic order. The original site for the school was at nearby Oak Hill. When Birkfield House was bought, Oak Hill was used as the College's prep school. With the creation of a new, purpose-built prep facility, Oak Hill ceased to be part of the school site. In 1996 the school merged with a girls' school, the Convent of Jesus and Mary, and became independent of the De La Salle order. However, the order retained the freehold of the site and charged rent to the school. In 2014, the school bought the freehold outright. As a result of the merger with the girls' school, the College crest was altered. Whilst the crest had previously borne two oak leaves (reflecting Oak Hill, the original grounds of the school), and the de la Salle star, the design at that time replaced one of the oak leaves with a crown of thorns from the crest of the Jesus and Mary Convent School.

Future Development
The College campus has evolved over the decades. There is a ‘Building for the Future’ programme underway. Phases 1 and 2 have already been completed, with a new Technology Centre and a state-of-the-art Sixth Form Centre. Other buildings on the site include the Prep School, with rounded walls, a circular library and high-tech classrooms. The grounds include trees, shrubberies, gardens, sports pitches and open spaces. The College has an Astroturf for all weather sports, tennis courts, a sports hall and a changing room block/PE office.

House system

The College currently has four houses:

 Birkfield (Red)
 Goldrood (Yellow)
 La Salle (Green)
 Orwell (Blue)

Birkfield House takes its name from the Georgian building of the same name found at the centre of the campus. Birkfield House was the original building that the school moved into in 1946. Birkfield Mews is one of the two boarding houses on campus, but it is more commonly known as ‘The Mews’. Goldrood House is named after ‘The Gold Rood’ house and estate, which the school acquired in 1963. The mansion, built in 1811 is now home to 50 boarders, having previously been the home of the Prep School. Prior to the Mansion's existence, the land held an ancient cross - or rood - erected in monastic times. La Salle House is named in honour of the College's patron saint, John-Baptist de la Salle (1651–1719), a French priest and educational reformer who spent his life teaching poor children in parish charity schools. Saint John-Baptist is also the patron saint of teachers. Orwell House takes its name from the River Orwell flowing through Suffolk and visible from the first floor windows of the buildings on the College campus.

The house system originally had two houses designated for day pupils and two for boarders, all named after major figures in England's Roman Catholic history:

 Campion (named after St Edmund Campion, an English Jesuit and martyr) (green) [Boarders]
 Sherwin (named after St Ralph Sherwin, an English martyr) (blue) [Boarders]
 More (named after St Thomas More, English lawyer, politician and martyr) (black) [Day pupils]
 Beckett (named after St Thomas Becket, an early archbishop of Canterbury and martyr) (orange) [Day pupils]

Boarding
The College offers full, weekly and flexi-boarding and its boarders come from both the United Kingdom and overseas. Goldrood House is used for younger male boarding students and The Mews for female boarders, as well as Sixth Form boys, with separate sleeping areas.

Annual Rugby Festival
The National Schools Rugby Festival was launched in 1987 to commemorate the Golden Jubilee of the College. Schools invited to take part come from both the state and independent sectors. The Festival has a track record as a proving ground of future stars: former England captain Chris Robshaw; British and Irish Lion Mako Vunipola; England winger Charlie Sharples; Zach Mercer, Player of the Tournament 2014, who went on to help England to the World Rugby U20 Championship in June; Mike Tindall; Jonathan Joseph; Marcus Smith.

Chapel
One of the most notable buildings on the campus is the College Chapel. Built in a modern style, the Chapel design echoes the form of a tent, like those used by the Israelites whilst they were in the desert. In 2017, just as the Chapel reached its 50th anniversary, serious flaws in the roof were discovered. The building was temporarily closed for renovations, which were completed in 2019 and the Chapel was reopened to welcome the College community once again.

Old Birkfeldians

The Old Birkfeldians is the Alumni Association of St Joseph's College. It is named after the site of the original school (Birkfield House). It has been merged with the Alumni Association of the old Junior School (Old Oakhillians).

Richard Ayoade, actor and comedian
Derek Henderson, International DJ
Sean Blowers, actor
Sir Dominick Chilcott, British High Commissioner to Sri Lanka and Ambassador to Iran, Ireland and Turkey
Martin Chilcott, entrepreneur
Dominic Christian, CEO of Aon UK
Brian Eno, musician
Jonathan Green, journalist
Matt Henry, New Zealand cricketer
Matt Hunn, Kent cricketer
Trevor Jacques, writer and researcher in the area of consensual BDSM, sexual fetishism and sexual health
Stephen Kinsella, OBE Solicitor EU Law
Lewis Ludlam, Northampton Saints rugby player
John McDonnell, Labour Shadow Chancellor of the Exchequer
Pablo Miller
Pat Mills, comics writer and editor
Chris Mullin, Labour Member of Parliament
Dan Murphy, Harlequins rugby player
Peter Nelson, 9th Earl Nelson, hereditary peer
Vincent Regan, actor 
Drew Locke, rugby
Gareth Locke-Locke, television personality and reality star on Made in Chelsea 
Louise Rickard, rugby player
James Rowe, professional football manager
George Wacokecoke, Bath rugby player
Richard Westbrook, racing driver
David Willis, journalist

Sexual abuse
Francis Carolan, a former teacher of religious education and assistant housemaster at St Joseph's College was remanded in custody and charged in November 2021 with four offences of indecent assault on a boy aged between 14 and 15 in the early 1990s.

Popular culture
In August 2005, the school was used as the setting for the third and final season of the Channel 4 historical reality show That'll Teach 'Em. The school was re-branded as "Charles Darwin Grammar School" and took thirty sixteen-year-olds for a summer of 1950s style boarding school education, with an emphasis on practical sciences.

References

External links
 School Website

Private schools in Suffolk
 
Roman Catholic private schools in the Diocese of East Anglia
Catholic boarding schools in England
Boarding schools in Suffolk
Schools in Ipswich
1937 establishments in England